The 2009–10 IRB Sevens World Series was the eleventh of an annual series of rugby union sevens tournaments for full national sides run by the International Rugby Board since 1999–2000. Samoa won the IRB Sevens World Series crown for their first time.

Sevens is traditionally played in a two-day tournament format. However, the most famous event, the Hong Kong Sevens, is played over three days, largely because it involves 24 teams instead of the normal 16.

The 2009-10 Series was won by Samoa, who won four of the eight tournaments and placed second in two others. Samoa were led by top try-scorer Mikaele Pesamino, who led the Series with 56 tries.

Itinerary
The series' tournaments were identical to those in 2008–09 and spanned the globe, visiting five of the six populated continents.

Two minor changes were made to the schedule:
 The USA event moved from San Diego, its home from 2007 to 2009, to Las Vegas.
 The Adelaide event moved from its previous slot of one week after Hong Kong to one week before.

Core teams
Before each season, the IRB announces the 12 "core teams" that will receive guaranteed berths in each event in that season's series. The core teams for 2009–10 were:

The core teams were unchanged from 2008–09; the most recent change came before that season, when the USA replaced its neighbor Canada.

Points schedule
The season championship is determined by points earned in each tournament. Effective with this season, the IRB changed the points allocations for all events as follows:

16-team events (all except for Hong Kong)
Cup winner (1st place): 24 points
Cup runner-up: 20 points
Losing Cup semifinalists: 16 points
Plate winner (5th place): 12 points
Plate runner-up: 8 points
Losing Plate semifinalists: 6 points
Bowl winner (9th place): 4 points

24-team event (Hong Kong)
Cup winner: 30 points
Cup runner-up: 25 points
Losing Cup semifinalists: 20 points
Plate winner (5th place): 16 points
Plate runner-up: 10 points
Losing Plate semifinalists: 8 points
Bowl winner (9th place): 5 points

Tournament structure
In all tournaments except Hong Kong, 16 teams participate. Due to its place as the sport's most prestigious annual event, the Hong Kong tournament has 24 teams. In each 16-team tournament, the teams are divided into pools of four teams, who play a round-robin within the pool. Points are awarded in each pool on a different schedule from most rugby tournaments—3 for a win, 2 for a draw, 1 for a loss. The first tiebreaker is the head-to-head result between the tied teams, followed by difference in points scored during the tournament.

Four trophies are awarded in each tournament. In descending order of prestige, they are the Cup, whose winner is the overall tournament champion, Plate, Bowl and Shield. The Shield was contested in Hong Kong for the first time in 2010. Each trophy is awarded at the end of a knockout tournament.

In a 16-team tournament, the top two teams in each pool advance to the Cup competition. The four quarterfinal losers drop into the bracket for the Plate. The Bowl is contested by the third- and fourth-place finishers in each pool, with the losers in the Bowl quarterfinals dropping into the bracket for the Shield.

The Hong Kong Sevens adopted a new structure effective with its 2010 edition. As in previous years, the 24 teams were divided into six pools of four teams each, with the competition points system and tiebreakers identical to those for a 16-team event. Also as in the past, the six pool winners and the two top second-place finishers advanced to the Cup competition. The changes made in 2010 were:
 The Plate competition was contested by the losing quarterfinalists from the Cup, as in all other events in the series.
 The Bowl was contested by the four remaining second-place finishers and the top four third-place finishers. In previous years, these teams competed for the Plate.
 The Shield was contested by the remaining eight entrants. In previous years, these teams competed for the Bowl.

Final standings
The points awarded to teams at each event, as well as the overall season totals, are shown in the table below. Points for the event winners are indicated in bold. A zero (0) is recorded in the event column where a team competed in a tournament but did not gain any points. A dash (–) is recorded in the event column if a team did not compete at a tournament.

Notes:

Light blue line on the left indicates a core team eligible to participate in all events of the series.

Player scoring

Most points

Most tries

Tournaments

Dubai

South Africa

New Zealand

United States

Australia

Hong Kong

London

Scotland

References

External links

London Sevens Profile on UR7s.com

 
World Rugby Sevens Series